The Miners is a 1937 Soviet comedy film directed by Sergei Yutkevich.

Plot 
The chief of one mine in a small town in the Donbas Chub is playing along with the Trotskyites and bandits. A certain Semyon Primak arrives at the mine and begins to confront Chub. Slaughterer Matvey Bobylyov, in spite of their disassembly, begins to mine coal with a completely new method.

Starring 
 Boris Poslavsky
 Yuriy Tolubeev
 Vladimir Lukin	
 Zoya Fyodorova
 Yefim Altus
 Mark Bernes	
 Stepan Kayukov	
 Stepan Kuznetsov		
 Konstantin Nazarenko		
 Nina Rusinova as Olga Bobylyova

References

External links 

1937 films
1930s Russian-language films
Soviet black-and-white films
Soviet comedy-drama films
1937 comedy-drama films